Toyota GB may refer to:

Toyota (GB) PLC, the subsidiary of Toyota in Great Britain
Toyota G1#GB a Toyota truck